Warren Hamilton is an American politician and retired military officer serving as a member of the Oklahoma Senate from the 7th district. Elected in November 2020, he assumed office on January 5, 2021.

Early life and education 
Hamilton was raised in rural Texas. His mother was a teacher and his father was a school principal. He graduated high school in 1989 and he graduated from the United States Military Academy in 1993.

Career 
Hamilton served in the United States Army from 1989 to 2005, including as a platoon leader and company commander. In the 1990's, he attended flight school in Fort Rucker and later flew AH-1 Cobras at Fort Bliss and Fort Carson. He also flew scout helicopters in Bosnia.In 2001, he served as an Army exchange pilot to the Marine Corps and reported for duty at Camp Pendelton. He was later deployed in Japan, the Philippines, and Iraq.

After 2005, Hamilton left the Army with the rank of Major and by 2006 had begun work as a defense contractor. He flew helicopters in Iraq and Afghanistan as a contractor until 2012. In 2010, Hamilton married his wife Sherrie and moved to Oklahoma in 2010.

Hamilton currently works as the owner and operator of Rocky Point Ranch in McCurtain, Oklahoma.

Oklahoma Senate 
He was elected to the Oklahoma Senate in November 2020 and assumed office on January 11, 2021.

Hamilton has been highly critical of the COVID-19 vaccine stating “If you call yourself a Christian and you can square injecting yourself with the remains of murdered people, I’d say you’ve got some self reflection perhaps you need to do.”

In February 2022, Hamilton filed a bill that prohibits foreign-owned businesses from buying land in Oklahoma.
In support of the bill he stated "This is America... In order to own a piece of it, you should be an American. To allow any foreign entity to own a piece of America is treasonous."

During a debate over a bill banning most abortions in Oklahoma, Hamilton inquired as to why language about ectopic pregnancy was in the bill.

References 

Year of birth missing (living people)
Living people
United States Military Academy alumni
United States Army officers
People from Haskell County, Oklahoma
Republican Party Oklahoma state senators
21st-century American politicians